Punisher: The Platoon is a 2017 war comic book limited series published by Marvel Comics under the MAX imprint, the series centered around the character of Frank Castle during his first tour in Vietnam as a young man. It is written by Garth Ennis who has previously worked extensively on the character of Frank Castle (the Punisher), under the Punisher Max line and in mainstream Marvel comics.

Development
The series serves as a prequel to Ennis' earlier series Born.

Publication history
The first issue of the series was published with three variants; one with a cover by Andre Brase, another with a Marco Checchetto cover and the final being a "How-to-Draw Variant". The second issue received a variant cover by Scott Hepburn and Ian Herring.

Plot
The series focuses on Frank Castle as a young man during his first tour in Vietnam, with a framing narrative of both American soldiers in Castle's platoon and an NVA General being interviewed in the modern day. As the interview goes on, Frank's mindset emerges as the forerunner of later Punisher way to fight crime; his own men, now older, recognize that. During the tour, Castle antagonizes a young Vietcong girl, who sets out to take revenge on him, almost succeeding.

Reception
The series holds an average rating of 8.4 by sixteen professional critics according to review aggregation website Comic Book Roundup.

Prints

Issues

Collected editions

Notes

References

External links

2017 comics debuts
2018 comics endings
Marvel Comics set during the Vietnam War
Marvel Comics limited series
Punisher titles
Comics by Garth Ennis
Comics about the United States Marine Corps